Battersby is a village in North Yorkshire, England.

See also
Battersby railway station

External links

Villages in North Yorkshire